Acleris thylacitis is a species of moth of the family Tortricidae. It is found in Kenya and Uganda.

References

Moths described in 1920
thylacitis
Moths of Africa